The Academy of Contemporary Music (ACM) is a music academy in Guildford, Surrey, England providing contemporary music-based courses.

The school of music has a focus on rock, pop music, electronic dance music and a vocational approach. The school has links with Guildford's Electric Theatre, Guildford College, Middlesex University and University of Surrey.

History
The Academy of Contemporary Music was created by guitar tutor Phil Brookes and Peter Anderton of Andertons Music Co. In the 2000s, the academy partnered with three educational establishments for awarding qualifications: Guildford College which grants BTEC/Edexcel awards for the lower discipline, Middlesex University and the University of Surrey. The latter validate the Certificate in Higher Education for the intermediate discipline, award degrees at BA (Hons) and BMus (Hons) through to an MA (Masters) in contemporary music in partnership with ACM.

Awards
In May 2008, ACM was awarded The Queen's Award for Enterprise: Innovation (Technology). In late 2009, with support from the University of Central Oklahoma, ACM opened a base outside of the UK in Downtown Oklahoma City, appointing Scott Booker as executive director.

In August 2013, ownership of ACM was acquired by Kainne Clements, who also co-owns Metropolis Studios.

Previous students
Alumni / former students of ACM (including academic music courses in which vocational placements were made with ACM) include:
 Newton Faulkner, guitarist/singer/songwriter whose album Hand Built By Robots went to number one in the UK Album Charts.
 Amelle Berrabah, member of The Sugababes.
 Ben King, lead guitarist with The Yardbirds.
 Guy Davis, of rock group Reuben.
 Ed Sheeran, singer/songwriter, Ivor Novello, Brit Award and Grammy winner
 Zomboy, dubstep producer
 Ryan Fletcher and Joel Peat of the band Lawson
 Molly Smitten-Downes, Singer-Songwriter and the United Kingdom's Eurovision Song Contest 2014 entry
Dominic Lyne, author
 Rabea Massaad, guitarist (Dorje and Toska)
George Berry, drummer/producer, Bears In Trees
 Jan-Vincent Velazco, member of Pendragon (band)
 Jamie Irrepressible (founding member) The Irrepressibles

References

External links
 The Academy of Contemporary Music website

Music industry associations
Music schools in England
Education in Guildford
Educational institutions established in 1997
1997 establishments in England
Music organisations based in the United Kingdom